Robyn Anne Carston,  is a linguist and academic, who specialises in pragmatics, semantics, and the philosophy of language. Since 2005, she has been Professor of Linguistics at University College London.

Early life and education
Carston was born in New Zealand. She studied English literature at the University of Canterbury, graduating with a Bachelor of Arts (BA) 1975. She then studied for an honours degree in linguistics at Victoria University of Wellington, graduating with a BA (Hons) degree in 1976. She moved to England to study at University College London (UCL), graduating with a Master of Arts (MA) with Distinction in Phonetics and Linguistics in 1980. She remained at UCL to undertake postgraduate research under the supervision of Deirdre Wilson. and got her first job as a lecturer there in 1983. She completed her Doctor of Philosophy (PhD) degree in 1994. Her doctoral thesis was titled "Pragmatics and the explicit/implicit distinction".

Academic career
Carston has taught linguistics at University College London since 1983. Since January 1999, she has been an editor of the peer-reviewed interdisciplinary journal Mind & Language. In January 2005, she was appointed Professor of Linguistics. From 2007 to 2017, she was additionally a senior researcher at the Centre for the Study of Mind in Nature, University of Oslo. Since August 2017, she has been President of the European Society for Philosophy and Psychology.

Honours
In July 2016, Carston was elected a Fellow of the British Academy (FBA), the UK's national academy for the humanities and the social sciences.

Selected works

References

Living people
Linguists from New Zealand
Philosophers of language
Pragmaticists
Semanticists
Academics of University College London
University of Canterbury alumni
Victoria University of Wellington alumni
Alumni of University College London
Women linguists
Year of birth missing (living people)
New Zealand emigrants to the United Kingdom